A delayed release or late release may refer to:

 Delayed release (film), the delayed release of a film to the public
 Delayed release (pharmacology), oral medicines that do not immediately disintegrate and release the active ingredient(s) into the body
 [+delayed release], a distinctive feature given to affricate consonants in phonology
 Late release, a term associated with vaporware in software development